Our Lady of the Rosary Parish - designated for Polish immigrants in Springfield, Massachusetts, United States.

 Founded 1917. It is one of the Polish-American Roman Catholic parishes in New England in the Diocese of Springfield in Massachusetts.
The Diocese of Springfield announced that the parish would close after Mass on January 28, 2018, owing to declining attendance and maintenance issues. Immaculate Conception Parish will serve as the receiving parish.

References

Bibliography 
 
 The Official Catholic Directory in USA

External links 
 Our Lady of the Rosary - Diocesan Information
 Our Lady of the Rosary - ParishesOnline.com
 Our Lady of the Rosary - TheCatholicDirectory.com 
 Diocese of Springfield in Massachusetts

Roman Catholic parishes of Diocese of Springfield in Massachusetts
Polish-American Roman Catholic parishes in Massachusetts